is a Japanese field hockey player born in Kurihara. At the 2012 Summer Olympics and 2016 Summer Olympics she competed with the Japan women's national field hockey team in the women's tournament.

References

External links
 

Living people
1989 births
Field hockey players at the 2012 Summer Olympics
Field hockey players at the 2016 Summer Olympics
Olympic field hockey players of Japan
Japanese female field hockey players
Asian Games medalists in field hockey
Field hockey players at the 2010 Asian Games
Field hockey players at the 2014 Asian Games
Universiade medalists in field hockey
Asian Games bronze medalists for Japan
Medalists at the 2010 Asian Games
People from Miyagi Prefecture
Universiade bronze medalists for Japan
Medalists at the 2013 Summer Universiade
Field hockey players at the 2020 Summer Olympics
21st-century Japanese women